Nikola Dudášová (born March 17, 1995) is a Slovak basketball player for NKA Universitas PEAC and the Slovak national team.

She participated at the EuroBasket Women two times (2017 and 2021).

References

1995 births
Living people
Slovak women's basketball players
Sportspeople from Banská Bystrica
Shooting guards